The LGV Méditerranée (French: Ligne à Grande Vitesse; English: Mediterranean high-speed line) is a  French high-speed rail line running between Saint-Marcel-lès-Valence, Drôme and Marseille, Bouches-du-Rhône, also featuring a connection to Nîmes, Gard (west of the line).

It connects the regions of Provence-Alpes-Côte d'Azur and Occitanie to the LGV Rhône-Alpes, and from there to Lyon and the north of France. Construction costs rose to €3.8 billion; the line entered service in June 2001 following an inauguration by President Jacques Chirac. The commencement of service on this line has led to a reversal of the respective airplane and train markets: by making Marseille reachable in three hours from Paris—a distance of over —the train now handles two-thirds of all journeys on that route. LGVs Méditerranée, Rhône-Alpes and Sud-Est, when completed, also received their official nickname, the City To Coast (C2C) Highway ("Ville à la Mer").

Route
The LGV Méditerranée begins in the southeast at Saint-Marcel-lès-Valence, as the extension of the LGV Rhône-Alpes. The new Gare de Valence TGV lies at the interchange with the regular Valence-Grenoble line, allowing rapid connections towards Valence, Romans-sur-Isère and Grenoble. At Crest, an emergency link is provided to the Briançon-Loriol line. The LGV then approaches the Rhône, rejoining the A7 autoroute at Montélimar. After crossing the Canal de Donzère-Mondragon, the line connects to the regular network by an emergency link situated between Pierrelatte and Lapalud.

Spanning the Rhône three times (twice at Mornas, once north of Roquemaure), the LGV continues to Angles, where a triangle allows access to the southwest and southeast. The southwest branch is generally thought of as the beginning of a future LGV Languedoc-Roussillon, joining the regular Avignon-Nîmes line  later at Redessan and since 2017 the LGV Nîmes-Montpellier. The southeast branch crosses the Rhône again on two parallel viaducts and serves the new Avignon-TGV station, then follows the Durance which it crosses at Orgon.

At Ventabren, a  viaduct extends across the A8 autoroute, the D10 and the Canal de Provence.

Stations

 Gare de Valence TGV at Saint-Marcel-lès-Valence; a unique two-level station (below, TGVs; above, TERs) which allows rapid connections towards Valence, Grenoble and Romans-sur-Isère
 Gare d'Avignon TGV south of Avignon; its proximity to the city centre has ensured its popularity.  An enhancement to the station allowed it to be served by local services connecting to Avignon's central station, amongst others.
 Gare d'Aix-en-Provence TGV near the Réaltor reservoir, halfway between Aix-en-Provence and Marseille Airport; this station has proved more popular than expected and serves the north of the Marseille area.  It is also recommended by agents for ships in Fos-Lavera-Port de Bouc, in preference to Marseille.  The station has a road connection to Aix-en-Provence, but no classic rail connection as with Valence TGV.

Controversy
 Numerous protests, particularly from well connected wine growers of the Rhône Valley, made President Mitterrand force alterations to the route; the original path would have kept to the left bank of the river, while the final route skirts the river and crosses it four times, at a significantly higher cost.
Numerous connections had however been proposed:
 a link at Saint-Marcel-lès-Valence between the LGV (southwards) and the regular line (eastwards), accompanied by the electrification of the Valence-Grenoble line. This would permit direct connections between Grenoble and the Mediterranean; instead, passengers traveling between Marseille and Grenoble must change at Valence-TGV; with the Valence to Geneva line through Grenoble now electrified, this link becomes more attractive and a connection is considered for the near-future; another link from the LGV (southwards) to the regular line (towards Valence) would have enabled service to Valence central station from the south; 
 a link at Roquemaure from the north towards Avignon would not only have enabled service to Avignon central station, but would have enabled faster service for Arles. A link south of Avignon would equally have permitted the linking of Avignon central station with Marseille in 25 minutes
 the regular use of the existing link at Pierrelatte would have enabled rapid service to Orange from the north, as well as Avignon and Arles, given that no link was created at Roquemaure
 a link at Orgon with the Avignon-Miramas line via Cavaillon would have enabled service to Salon-de-Provence, Miramas and Istres from the north
 Montélimar wanted a TGV station.  This would offer the advantage of being able to serve the town with TGV services travelling further south, but Montélimar is currently served by various TGV services leaving the high-speed line just before Valence TGV station.
 Aix-en-Provence wanted its TGV station more eastwards, closer to the town centre.

Journey times

From Paris
 Paris–Lyon-Saint Exupéry Airport: 1:50
 Paris–Valence: 2:16
 Paris–Avignon: 2:40
 Paris–Aix en Provence:  2:55
 Paris–Marseille:  3:07
 Paris–Toulon:  3:55
 Paris–Hyères:  4:15
 Paris–Fréjus:  4.40
 Paris–Nice:  5.35
 Paris–Nîmes:  2:55
 Paris–Montpellier:  3:15
 Paris–Béziers:  4:03
 Paris–Perpignan:  4:45

Interregional
 Lyon–Marseille:  1:40
 Lyon–Toulouse:  4:30
 London–Marseille: 6:28
 Lille–Nice:  7:09
 Metz–Nice:  9:15
 Geneva–Marseille:  3.30

See also 
 TGV
 High-speed rail in France

References

External links
High-speed rail lines site (in French)

Mediterranee
Railway lines opened in 2001